The Office of Scientific Research and Development (OSRD) was an agency of the United States federal government created to coordinate scientific research for military purposes during World War II. Arrangements were made for its creation during May 1941, and it was created formally by Executive Order 8807 on June 28, 1941. It superseded the work of the National Defense Research Committee (NDRC), was given almost unlimited access to funding and resources, and was directed by Vannevar Bush, who reported only to President Franklin Delano Roosevelt.

The research was widely varied, and included projects devoted to new and more accurate bombs, reliable detonators, work on the proximity fuze, guided missiles, radar and early-warning systems, lighter and more accurate hand weapons, more effective medical treatments (including work to make penicillin at scale, which was necessary for its use as a drug), more versatile vehicles, and, the most secret of all, the S-1 Section, which later became the Manhattan Project and developed the first atomic weapons.

References

External links
Office of Scientific Research and Development Collection at Library of Congress. Original research conducted by the U.S. and Allies during World War II- includes technical reports, memos, drawings, etc.
OSRD OSRD timeline
Records of the OSRD at the National Archive
Stewart, Irvin. Organizing Scientific Research for War: The Administrative History of the Office of Scientific Research and Development. Boston: Little, Brown and Company, 1948.

Agencies of the United States government during World War II
Nuclear history of the United States
Research organizations in the United States
Government agencies established in 1941
Research and development in the United States
Military research of the United States
Defunct agencies of the Executive Office of the President of the United States